There were four Pacific Rugby League International in 2010. The first was the ANZAC test in May. Then Samoa and Fiji in June. In June there were two games between Samoa and New Zealand and then the Polynesian Cup between Samoa and Tonga.

Results

ANZAC test

The 2010 ANZAC Test was a rugby league test match played between Australia and New Zealand on 7 May 2010. The match coincided with the official opening of AAMI Park in Melbourne. The match was won by Australia with a score of 12–8.

Samoa vs Fiji

New Zealand vs Samoa

Polynesian Cup

Further reading
 International rugby league in 2010
 2010 Rugby League Four Nations

References

Pacific Rugby League International
Rugby league in Sydney
2010 in Fijian sport
2010 in Tongan sport
2018 in Samoan sport